Stade El Menzah is a multi-purpose stadium, located in the north of Tunis, Tunisia.

History

Stade Vélodrome is the historical stadium that preceded Stade El Menzah. It was built in 1927 in the same location and became the stadium of US Tunis and Italia de Tunis. It had a capacity of 5,000 spectators.

The stadium was named after the president of US Tunis, Henri Smadja. It was also named after Carmel Borg, a maltese businessman. So it became Stade Smadja-Borg.
It was the main stadium for the Tunisian national team in the 1930s and 1940s In addition to the Tunisian Cup final since the 1929 edition,  before the construction of the Stade Géo André in 1942.

After World War II, the stadium was named again after Victor Perez, a Tunisian boxer who was World Fly Champion in 1931 and was killed in the Nazi concentration camps in Gleiwitz in 1945.

After independence, the Stade Géo André was the stadium of the Tunisian national team, before the Vélodrome was demolished and completely rebuilt in 1967 after cooperation between Tunisian and Bulgarian engineers.

Stands
Tribune d'honneur: 400 places

Tribune de presse: 480 places

Pelouse: 10 952 places

Gradins: 9 664 places

Virages: 13 056 places

Enceintes: 5 786 places

Sporting events

It is built to host the 1967 Mediterranean Games at the same time as the Olympic swimming pool and gymnasium. Since then, it is an integral part of Tunisia's main sports complex. Tunisia's three major football teams, ES Tunis, Club Africain and Stade Tunisien played their games there.

The stadium was completely renovated for the 1994 African Cup of Nations. It has a capacity of 45,000 seats. The VIP section consists of a grandstand and 2 salons that can accommodate 300 people in a "cocktail" configuration. The stadium hosted the matches of Tunisia national football team until the inauguration of the Stade 7 November in Radès in 2001.

It is expected that the rehabilitation works will start in late 2022 and will continue for two years, after a large part of the stadium was closed for years, in order to relieve the stadium of Radès, which now receives all the matches of the Tunis teams.

Music events
Popstar Michael Jackson performed his first and only concert in Tunisia, at this stadium during his HIStory World Tour on October 7, 1996 in front of 60,000 fans.

Sting performed at the stadium during his Brand New Day Tour on April 28, 2001.

Mariah Carey kicked off The Adventures of Mimi Tour at the stadium on July 22 and 24, 2006.

References

External links

Photos of Stadiums in Tunisia at cafe.daum.net/stade
Photos at worldstadiums.com
Photos at fussballtempel.net
Photos and Facts at footballmatch.de
Stade El Menzah on the official "National Sports City" website
StadiumDB page

Sports venues completed in 1967
Tunis
Sports venues in Tunisia
Sport in Tunis
Multi-purpose stadiums in Tunisia